Avyan may refer to:
 Avian, Iran
 Abian, Iran